John Galt is a fictional character in the 1957 book Atlas Shrugged by Ayn Rand.

John Galt may also refer to:

 John Galt (novelist) (1779–1839), Scottish writer, entrepreneur, political commentator and historical founder of Guelph, Ontario

See also
 John Galt Corporation, American demolition and construction contractor
 John Galt Solutions, Inc., American software company
 The John A. Galt telescope at the Dominion Radio Astrophysical Observatory
 John Gault, American inventor